Coal City  may refer to:
Coal City, Illinois, USA
Coal City, Indiana, USA
Coal City, Iowa, US
Coal City, Utah, USA
Coal City, West Virginia, USA
Nickname for Enugu, Nigeria